Dale's Wail is an album by American jazz trumpeter Roy Eldridge recorded in 1953 and originally released on the Clef label.

Reception

Allmusic awarded the album 4½ stars stating it " features the great swing trumpeter at the peak of his powers".

Track listing
All compositions by Roy Eldridge except as indicated
 "Dale's Wail" - 3:42
 "Love for Sale" (Cole Porter) - 3:39
 "The Man I Love" (George Gershwin, Ira Gershwin) - 3:38
 "Oscar's Arrangement" - 2:40
 "Willow Weep for Me" (Ann Ronell) - 3:18
 "Somebody Loves Me" (George Gershwin, Ballard MacDonald) - 3:30
 "When Your Lover Has Gone" (Einar Aaron Swan) - 3:06
 "When It's Sleepy Time Down South" (Clarence Muse, Leon René, Otis René) - 3:02
 "Feeling a Draft" - 3:29
 "Don't Blame Me" (Jimmy McHugh, Dorothy Fields) - 3:10
 "Echoes of Harlem" (Duke Ellington) - 3:59
 "I Can't Get Started" (Vernon Duke, Ira Gershwin) - 3:21 
Recorded in New York City on April 20, 1953 (tracks 1-4) and in Los Angeles, CA in December 1953 (tracks 5-12)

Personnel 
Roy Eldridge - trumpet
Oscar Peterson - piano, organ
Herb Ellis (tracks 5-12), Barney Kessel (tracks 1-4)  - guitar
Ray Brown - bass
Jo Jones (tracks 1-4), Alvin Stoller (tracks 5-12) - drums

References 

1955 albums
Roy Eldridge albums
Clef Records albums
Verve Records albums
Albums produced by Norman Granz